Bai Ze is a mythical beast in ancient China. It can speak, understand the feelings of all things, and know the affairs of ghosts and gods, and only appears when "the king has virtue", and can ward off all evil spirits on earth.
According to the History of Yuan, the white tiger has a horned head and a dragon body. According to "Ming Ji Li", Bai Ze has a dragon head with green hair and horns, and four legs in the shape of flying.

The Bái Zé was encountered by the Yellow Emperor or Huáng Dì while he was on patrol in the east. Thereafter the creature dictated to Huáng Dì  a guide to the forms and habits of all 11,520 types of supernatural creatures in the world, and how to overcome their hauntings and attacks. The emperor had this information written down in a book called the Bái Zé Tú (白泽图/白澤圖). This book no longer exists, but many fragments of it survive in other texts.

In Japan

The common Japanese image generally depicts the hakutaku as a "cow or monstrous cat creature with nine eyes and six horns, arranged in sets of three and two on both its flanks and its man-like face. It is also commonly depicted as having the body of a lion and eight eyes, known for having a horn or multiple horns on their heads." However, the number of extra eyes actually varies depending on interpretation, and sometimes the creature is pictured with only one in the center of its head. It is considered to be "intelligent, and well read with the ability to understand human speech."

In Zen and Japanese Culture, D. T. Suzuki describes the hakutaku as "a mythical creature whose body resembles a hand and whose head is human. It was anciently believed that the creature ate our bad dreams and evil experiences, and for this reason, people, wishing it to eat up all the ills which we are likely to suffer, used to hang its picture on the entrance gate or inside the house."

Gallery

References
 
 
 
 

Chinese legendary creatures
Japanese legendary creatures

Human-headed mythical creatures